William Lee Overmyer is a former American football linebacker.

Overmyer played college football as a defensive end at Ashland College, where he was named the school's "best defensive lineman" in 1969, 1970 and 1971.  In 1971 he also earned an honorable mention in the Associated Press All-America team and he was a second-team of the Kodak College All-America Football Team.  He was inducted into Ashland's hall of fame in 2004.

Overmyer was drafted by the Philadelphia Eagles in the 14th round of the 1972 NFL draft with the 352nd overall pick.  In the preseason he competed with three others – fellow rookie Will Foster and veterans Ike Kelley and Bill Cody – to replace Tim Rossovich, who was holding out and was eventually traded, to be the Eagles' middle linebacker after Steve Zabel was injured in training camp.  Overmyer said of the experience:

Because he always had to prove himself, his Eagles' teammates nicknamed him "underdog." Overmyer was waived late in the preseason but was later signed to join the Eagles' taxi squad.

He was activated for the first time in November for the Eagles' 9th game of the season against the Houston Oilers.  He then played in every game for the Eagles for the rest of the season, for a total of 6 games.  In the last game of the season, which proved to be his last game in the National Football League, he was credited with a kickoff return for no yards against the St. Louis Cardinals.  He was cut by the Eagles during the 1973 preseason.

In 1974 he signed with the Houston Texans of the World Football League but was not on their regular season roster. In 1975 he signed as a free agent with the Washington Redskins but was cut during preseason.

References

1949 births
American football linebackers
Philadelphia Eagles players
People from Fremont, Ohio
American football defensive ends